Jean-Nicolas-Sébastien Allamand (18 October 1716, or according to others, 18 September 1713 – 2 March 1787) was a Swiss-Dutch natural philosopher.

Life
He was born in Lausanne. At first he specialized in theology, and subsequently he came to the Netherlands, where he practised mathematics, physics, chemistry, and natural history, in Leiden. He met Willem 'sGravesande, who entrusted him with the education of his two sons and made him his executor. Allamand expanded his knowledge of physics, and with 'sGravesande's support, he became a professor of philosophy at the University of Franeker on 3 March 1747. Two years later, he was called back and became a professor of mathematics and philosophy at the University of Leiden. He accepted this position on 30 May with a reading of On the True Philosopher, which was mostly designed to praise his mentor.

As a practitioner of natural history, Allamand was important for the creation and expansion of a Cabinet of Natural History at the University. He also collected from his own funds a Cabinet of Natural Rarities, during his lifetime open to students in a hall behind the Academy building. He donated it to the University on his death on 2 March 1787. He also was a benefactor of the Cabinet of Antiquities. He had no children with his wife, Margaretha Crommelin.

Allamand was elected a Fellow of the Royal Society in 1747.

Works
He enriched the bird descriptions in the Dutch edition of Buffon's Histoire Naturelle with many additions and descriptions. Further, Allamand edited the writings of 'sGravensande, Oeuvres philosophiques et mathématiques (2 volumes, with 28 illustrations, Amsterdam 1774), and the Geschiedkundig Woordenboek of Prosper Marchand, which he edited.

He also translated from Latin: Brisson's Dierenrijk, Leiden 1762, to which he added many remarks. From French he translated: 
Oliver's Verhandeling over de Kometen, 1777.
H. Hopp's new description of Cape Good Hope, 1778.
Reading of Jakob Forster concerning different subjects, Leiden, 1793.
Herman Boerhaave's Elementen der scheikunde.
Ellis, Natuurlijke Historie van de Koraalgewassen en andere Zeeligchamen, Amsterdam, 1756. illustrated.

He wrote some essays on physics, and gave the first explanation of the Leyden jar.

References

1716 births
1787 deaths
Academic staff of Leiden University
People from Lausanne
Academic staff of the University of Franeker
Fellows of the Royal Society